Finasseur (1902–1909) was a French Thoroughbred racehorse who, at age three, won the two most prestigious races in France.

Background
Finasseur was bred by Edmond Blanc at his Haras de Jardy stud farm at Marnes-la-Coquette about sixteen kilometers west of central Paris and purchased for racing by Michel Ephrussi, a wealthy businessman connected to the Rothschild banking family of France.

Ephrussi entrusted the colt's race conditioning to trainer James d'Okhuysen.

Racing career
Sent to race at age two, Finasseur notably won the 1904 Prix des Chênes at Longchamp Racecourse in Paris.

As a three-year-old, Finasseur was the dominant horse in French racing, winning the Prix du President de la Republique at Maisons-Laffitte Racecourse, the then 1½ mile French Derby at Chantilly Racecourse. He was ridden to victory by future United States Racing Hall of Fame inductee Nash Turner. An American, Turner came to France for fellow American owner/trainer H. Eugene Leigh and chose to make his permanent home there. Finasseur then won what was the most prestigious race in France at the time, the Grand Prix de Paris. His other major win came in the Grand Prix de Bruxelles at the Hippodrome de Boitsfort in the Boitsfort suburb of Brussels, Belgium.

Stud career
Retired to stud duty at his owner's Haras du Gazon in Normandy, Finasseur had only been bred to a few mares when he injured himself in his stall and broke a leg bone. The injury forced his owner to euthanize the valuable horse. Of note, a Finasseur filly named Stanzia was purchased in utero by Haras San Ignacio in Argentina. Her colt, Solpido, was a successful runner who broke several Argentinian time records.

References
 Finasseur's pedigree and partial racing stats
 May 29, 1905 New York Times article on Finasseur winning the Prix du Jockey Club
 June 12, 1905 New York Times article on Finasseur winning the Grand Prix de Paris

1902 racehorse births
1909 racehorse deaths
Racehorses bred in France
Racehorses trained in France
French Thoroughbred Classic Race winners
Thoroughbred family 5-i